This article lists events that occurred during 2007 in Estonia.

Incumbents
President – Toomas Hendrik Ilves 
Prime Minister – Andrus Ansip

Events
Tallinn Synagogue was completed.
Swissôtel Tallinn was opened.
Estonian Public Broadcasting was established.

Births

Deaths

See also
 2007 in Estonian football
 2007 in Estonian television

References

 
2000s in Estonia
Estonia
Estonia
Years of the 21st century in Estonia